John Camp (died c. 1395), of Cambridge and Dullingham, Cambridgeshire, was an English politician and lawyer.

Family
His first wife was named Katherine. His second wife, Elizabeth, bore him a son, Thomas Camp, who was MP for Cambridgeshire.

Career
He was a Member (MP) of the Parliament of England for Cambridge in February 1388 and 1391.

References

Year of birth missing
1395 deaths
English MPs February 1388
English MPs 1391
14th-century English lawyers
People from Cambridge